Clara Burel (born 24 March 2001) is a French tennis player. On 21 February 2022, she peaked at No. 74 in the WTA singles rankings. In singles, she reached two Grand Slam junior finals and won two silver medals at the Youth Summer Olympics. In 2018, she became the junior world No. 1.

Junior career
In 2018, Burel reached the junior singles final at three major events, the Australian Open, the US Open and the Youth Summer Olympics (YOG). Partnering with compatriot Hugo Gaston, she also won the mixed doubles bronze medal at the YOG. In October, Burel qualified for the ITF Junior Masters, where she captured her first major title. She became the junior world No. 1 the next week, on October 29.

Junior Grand Slam results - Singles:
 Australian Open: F (2018)
 French Open: 3R (2018)
 Wimbledon: 3R (2018)
 US Open: F (2018)

Junior Grand Slam results - Doubles:
 Australian Open: 2R (2018)
 French Open: 2R (2017, 2018)
 Wimbledon: QF (2018)
 US Open: 2R (2018)

Professional career

2018: First final
Following her final in Melbourne, Burel was selected as an alternate in the French Fed Cup team for the 2018 first round against Belgium. In September, she reached her first final on the Pro Circuit at Clermont-Ferrand, falling to Lesley Kerkhove.

2019: Grand Slam debut
Burel was a wildcard entrant in the Australian Open, where she lost in the first round to Carla Suárez Navarro.

2020: French Open debut and third round
In 2020, Burel received wildcards for two WTA and the Grand Slam home tournaments. In March in Lyon, she lost in the first round to Jil Teichmann. In September in Strasbourg, she knocked out Kateryna Bondarenko before falling in the second round to Zhang Shuai. 

At the French Open the following week, she beat Arantxa Rus in the first round, and Kaja Juvan in the second round to reach the third round of a Grand Slam for the first time in her career becoming the youngest Frenchwoman since 18-year-old Alizé Cornet did so in 2008.

2021: First WTA final and top 100 debut
She qualified for the 2021 Australian Open and the 2021 Wimbledon Championships.

In July 2021, Burel reached her first WTA final at the Ladies Open Lausanne, losing in three sets to Tamara Zidanšek. As a result, she made her top 100 debut at world No. 98, on 19 July 2021.

2022: Top 75, first WTA 1000 win, US Open 3rd round
On 21 February 2022, she peaked at No. 74 in the singles rankings.

She qualified for the US Open, and reached the third round defeating Wimbledon champion and 25th seed, Elena Rybakina, and Alison Van Uytvanck, before losing to sixth seed Aryna Sabalenka. As a result, she moved close to 30 positions up in the rankings to No. 102.

2023: 3rd consecutive Australian Open and first win
She qualified for the 2023 Australian Open and defeated in the first round wildcard Talia Gibson.

Performance timelines

Only main-draw results in WTA Tour, Grand Slam tournaments, Fed Cup/Billie Jean King Cup and Olympic Games are included in win–loss records.

Singles
Current after the 2023 WTA Lyon Open.

Doubles

WTA career finals

Singles: 1 (runner-up)

ITF Circuit finals

Singles: 8 (3 titles, 5 runner–ups)

Junior Grand Slam tournament finals

Singles: 2 (2 runner-ups)

Notes

References

External links
 
 
 

2001 births
Living people
French female tennis players
Sportspeople from Rennes
People from Lannion
Tennis players at the 2018 Summer Youth Olympics
Sportspeople from Côtes-d'Armor
21st-century French women